Fihavanantsika is a political party in Madagascar, founded by Daniel Rajakoba in 2002. In the December 2006 presidential election, Rajakoba, the party's candidate, won 0.64% of the vote. Since the 23 September 2007 National Assembly elections it is no longer represented in parliament

References

External links
Fihavanantsika website

Political parties in Madagascar
Political parties established in 2002
2002 establishments in Madagascar